Ne Ch'e Ddhäwa is the Northern Tutchone name for an eroded tuya approximately 7 km up the Yukon River from Fort Selkirk (UTM zone 8V 383955 E, 69600091 N) (it has been informally called  Wootten's Cone) in the Fort Selkirk Volcanic Field of central Yukon, Canada. It has been described as a cinder cone or a subglacial mound. The volcano erupted subglacially  between 2.0 and 2.3 million years ago during the early Pleistocene, erupting hyaloclastite tuffs, breccias, and pillow breccias. These hyaloclastites locally contain exotic clasts and bodies of till melted from an ice sheet during the subglacial eruption.

See also
Volcanism of Canada
List of Northern Cordilleran volcanoes
List of volcanoes in Canada

References

{{: Jackson, L.E., Jr.et al., Pliocene and Pleistocene volcanic interaction with Cordilleran ice sheets, damming of the
Yukon River and vertebrate Palaeontology, Fort Selkirk Volcanic Group, west-central Yukon, Canada, Quaternary International (2011), Volume 260, 18 May 2012, Pages 3-20}}

Volcanoes of Yukon
Cinder cones of Canada
Subglacial mounds of Canada
Northern Cordilleran Volcanic Province
Pleistocene volcanoes